Pore is a town and municipality in the Department of Casanare, Colombia. 

Pore, which played a vital role during the independence movement, was the 18th town to be declared a Pueblo Patrimonio de Colombia (Heritage Town of Colombia) on March 1, 2021. It is the first municipality east of the Andes to be inducted into the Pueblo Patrimonio network.

References

Municipalities of Casanare Department